Carrigans Football Club is a Filipino association football club. They are currently playing in the Weekend Futbol League.
The name Carrigans, comes from the Scottish term "little rock".
The club is owned by Scottish businessman David Neary and has Philippine Science High School football field as their home pitch.
It is composed of players of different nationalities and some former professional players from United Football League.
Carrigans will be participating in one of the most prestigious leagues in Manila, Weekend Futbol League season 2013 – which will start this coming September 14.

History

Foundation and early years

With common passion for the sport and dedication in uplifting and promoting the sport of football in the Philippines, the team was founded by David Neary with former UFL players in December 2011.
Former players of Sunken Garden United and soccer aficionados all around the metro built the core of the club.

Current management

References

Football clubs in the Philippines
Sports teams in Metro Manila